John Ainsworth (born September 21, 1940) is an American Republican politician from Wisconsin.

Born in Shawano County, Wisconsin, Ainsworth was a dairy farmer. Ainsworth served in the Wisconsin State Assembly from 1991 to 2007.

Notes

|-

People from Shawano County, Wisconsin
Republican Party members of the Wisconsin State Assembly
1940 births
Living people
21st-century American politicians